Notopora is a genus of flowering plants belonging to the family Ericaceae.

Its native range is Northern South America to Northern Brazil.

Species
Species:

Notopora auyantepuiensis 
Notopora cardonae 
Notopora chimantensis 
Notopora schomburgkii 
Notopora smithiana

References

Ericaceae
Ericaceae genera